Bonningues-lès-Calais (literally Bonningues near Calais) is a commune in the Pas-de-Calais department in the Hauts-de-France region in northern France.

Geography
A farming village located 5 miles (10 km) southwest of Calais, on the D243 road near to junction 39 of the A16 autoroute.

Population

Sights
 The church of St. Pierre, dating from the twelfth century.

See also
Communes of the Pas-de-Calais department

References

Communes of Pas-de-Calais
Pale of Calais